The Zalău City Hall is a building in Zalău which was built in 1889.

History
In 1876, the city of Zalău was designated as the capital of Szilágy County. The building originally served to house the Court and Prosecutor's office of the county. The trapezoidal building has three external entrances and an interior yard.

References

External links
 Zalău City Hall

Government buildings completed in 1889
Monuments and memorials in Zalău
1889 in Hungary
Historic monuments in Sălaj County
City and town halls in Romania